The men's 4 × 400 metres relay event at the 1978 Commonwealth Games was held on 11 and 12 August at the Commonwealth Stadium in Edmonton, Alberta, Canada.

Medalists

*Athletes who competed in heats only

Results

Heats
Qualification: First 3 teams of each heat (Q) plus the next 2 fastest (q) qualified for the final.

Final

References

Heats results (The Canberra Times)
Final results (The Canberra Times)
Australian results

Athletics at the 1978 Commonwealth Games
1978